Kevin O'Sullivan (born 1984 in Baltimore, County Cork) is an Irish sportsperson.  He plays Gaelic football with his local club Ilen Rovers and was a member of the Cork senior inter-county team from 2004 until 2008.

References

1984 births
Living people
Ilen Rovers Gaelic footballers
Cork inter-county Gaelic footballers